Novokubovo (Yañı Qobaw) is a rural locality (a selo) in Chuvash-Kubovsky Selsoviet, Iglinsky District, Bashkortostan, Russia. The population was 283 as of 2010. There are 5 streets.

Geography 
Novokubovo is located 12 km east of Iglino (the district's administrative centre) by road. Starokubovo is the nearest rural locality.

References 

Rural localities in Iglinsky District